Liberato Tosti (22 May 1883 – 20 October 1950) was an Italian prelate of the Catholic Church who served in the diplomatic service of the Holy See. He became an archbishop in 1946 and led the offices representing the Holy See in Paraguay, Nicaragua, and Honduras.

Biography
Liberato Tosti was born on 22 May 1883 in Oriolo Romano, Italy. He was ordained a priest on 18 April 1908.

On 5 September 1946, Pope Pius appointed him titular archbishop of Leucas and Apostolic Nuncio to Paraguay. He received his episcopal consecration on 3 November 1946 in Buenos Aires from Archbishop Giuseppe Fietta, Apostolic Nuncio to Argentina.

On 4 October 1948, Pope Paul named him Apostolic Nuncio to both Nicaragua and Honduras. 

On 14 April 1950, Pope Pius named him a consultor to the Congregation for Seminaries and University Studies.

He died in Rome on 20 October 1950.

References

External links 
Catholic Hierarchy: Archbishop Liberato Tosti 

1883 births
1950 deaths
People from the Province of Viterbo
Apostolic Nuncios to Paraguay
Apostolic Nuncios to Nicaragua
Apostolic Nuncios to Honduras